The Riyadh Derby, also known as Capital Derby, is a local derby contested between the Saudi's two Riyadh-based clubs, Al-Hilal and Al-Nassr.

Results

Statistics
Both teams have played 34 matches till date. Al-Nassr FC won 10 direct matches. Al-Hilal won 17 matches. 7 matches ended in a draw.

Records
Biggest wins (3+ goals)

Honours

References

Al Hilal SFC matches
Al Nassr FC matches
Derby
Football in Saudi Arabia